Thrush-like schiffornis is a species complex that has been split into five species:

 Brown-winged schiffornis, Schiffornis turdina
 Russet-winged schiffornis, Schiffornis stenorhyncha
 Foothill schiffornis, Schiffornis aenea
 Northern schiffornis, Schiffornis veraepacis
 Guianan schiffornis, 	Schiffornis olivacea

Each of these species was split from the species complex by the American Ornithologists' Union in 2013.

References

Birds by common name